The Sickle Cell Disease Association of America, Inc. (SCDAA) is a nonprofit organization with the sole purpose of supporting research, education and funding of individuals, families those who are impacted by sickle cell disease.

Mission statement

"To advocate for and enhance our membership's ability to improve the quality of health, life and services for individuals, families and communities affected by sickle cell disease and related conditions, while promoting the search for a cure for all people in the world with sickle cell disease."

History

The Sickle Cell Disease Association of America, Inc. originated in Racine, Wisconsin.  Representatives from 15 different community-based sickle cell organizations came together at Wingspread, a community center, as guest of the Johnson Foundation.  There was a common belief that there was a need for national attention to sickle cell disease.  After a meeting, they created the "National Association for Sickle Cell Diseases". The name was changed in 1994 to the Sickle Cell Disease Association of America, Inc.  Over the course of several years, the organization has grown into over 40 different branches.  The organization has partnered with several different medical facilities, local and state government agencies to pursue national health care objectives.  Some of the organization's partnerships include: National Association for the Advancement of Colored People (NAACP), National Institutes of Health (NIH), Health Resources and Services Administration (HRSA), Centers for Disease Control (CDC), United Way of America, and the Robert Johnson Foundation.

Areas of emphasis
 Research 
 Public Health Education
 Professional Health Education
 Patient Services
 Community Services
 Support to Global Organizations and Practitioners

Events
The Sickle Cell Disease Association of America, Inc. hosts several events throughout each year.  It hosts the Annual National Sickle Cell Walk with the Stars the weekend after Labor Day each year.  The inaugural walk was held on September 6, 2014, at Lake Montebello in Baltimore, Maryland. This event typically will have a variety vendors, kid activities, prizes and celebrity guests. The Sickle Cell Disease National Convention is held annually during the first weekend of October in Baltimore's Inner Harbor.  The event will feature themed experience, with prizes, awards, auctions and educational sessions.

Notable supporters

Tionne 'T-Boz' Watkins - The National Celebrity Spokesperson for the SCDAA.
 Tiki Barber - The former NFL running back has sickle cell disease and does his part educating others.
 Prodigy - Hip Hop star promotes sickle cell awareness at different events, including the 2011 National Convention.
 Ryan Clark - NFL Super Bowl champion with the Pittsburgh Steelers.
 Devin McCourty and Ryan McCourty - Twins fight Sickle Cell Disease with Tackle Sickle Cell Organization.
 Kier "Junior" Spates - SCDAA National Celebrity Ambassador
 Larenz Tate - Actor is passionate about sickle cell awareness.
 Santonio Holmes - Runs benefit for son with sickle cell disease.

Branches and affiliates

Alabama
 North Alabama Sickle Cell Foundation - Huntsville
 SCDA - West Alabama Chapter - Northport
 SCDAA Central Alabama Chapter - Birmingham
 SCDAA - Alabama Chapter State Association - Mobile
 SCDAA - Mobile Chapter
 Sickle Cell Foundation of Greater Montgomery, Inc. - Montgomery
 Southeast Alabama Sickle Cell Association, Inc. - Tuskegee
 Tri County Sickle Cell Association, Inc. - Selma

Arizona
 Sickle Cell Anemia Society of Arizona, Inc. - Phoenix

California
 Sickle Cell Disease Foundation of California - Los Angeles

Colorado
 Colorado Sickle Cell Association - Denver

Connecticut
 Citizens for Quality Sickle Cell Care, Inc. - New Britain/Hartford
 SCDAA Southern Connecticut, Inc. - Bridgeport/New Haven

Florida
 SCDAA of Escambia & Santa Rosa Counties - Pensacola
 SCDAA of Levy/Marion Counties - Ocala
 SCDAA - Dade County Chapter, Inc. - Miami
 SCDAA - St. Petersburg Chapter
 Sickle Cell Association of Hillsborough County - Tampa
 Sickle Cell Disease Association of Broward County - Ft. Lauderdale
 Sickle Cell Disease Association of Florida, Inc. - Pensacola
 Sickle Cell Disease Association of Tri-County, Inc. - Orlando
 Sickle Cell Disease Association of Upper Pinellas/Pasco/Hernando Counties, Inc. - Clearwater
 Sickle Cell Disease Association of Volusia County - Daytona Beach
 Sickle Cell Foundation of Palm Beach County & Treasure Coast Inc. - West Palm Beach
 Sickle Cell Foundation, Inc. - Tallahassee

Georgia
 Sickle Cell Foundation of Georgia, Inc. - Atlanta

Illinois
 Sickle Cell Disease Association of Illinois - Chicago

Louisiana
 Baton Rouge Sickle Cell Anemia Foundation
 Northeast Louisiana Sickle Cell Anemia Foundation - Monroe
 SCDAA - Northwest Louisiana - Shreveport
 Sickle Cell Anemia Research Foundation - Alexandria
 Southwest Louisiana Sickle Cell Anemia, Inc. - Lake Charles

Maryland
 Maryland Sickle Cell Disease Association, Inc. (MSCDA)
 Sickle Cell Disease Association of America, Inc. - Baltimore

Massachusetts
 Greater Boston Sickle Cell Disease Association - Dorchester

Michigan
 SCDAA Michigan - Detroit

Nevada
 Nevada Childhood Cancer Foundation - Las Vegas

New Jersey
 The Sickle Cell Association of New Jersey, Inc. - Newark

New Mexico
 The Sickle Cell Council of New Mexico - Albuquerque

New York
 Queens Sickle Cell Advocacy Network - Queens Village

North Carolina
 Bridges Pointe Sickle Cell Foundation - Durham
 Community Health Interventions and Sickle Cell Agency, Inc. - Fayetteville
 Piedmont Health Services and Sickle Cell Agency - Greensboro
 SCDAA - Eastern North Carolina - Jacksonville

Ohio
 SCDAA - Ohio Sickle Cell & Health Association - Columbus

Oregon
 Sickle Cell Anemia Foundation of Oregon - Portland

Pennsylvania
 Children's Sickle Cell Foundation, Inc. - Pittsburgh
 SCDAA - Philadelphia/Delaware Valley Chapter
 The South Central PA Sickle Cell Council - Harrisburg

South Carolina
 James R. Clark Memorial Sickle Cell Foundation - Columbia

Tennessee
 Sickle Cell Foundation of Tennessee - Memphis

Texas
 SCDAA of Tarrant County - Fort Worth
 Sickle Cell Association of Austin and San Antonio Marc Thomas Foundation - Austin

Virginia
 Sickle Association, Inc. - Norfolk

References

External links
 

Disability organizations based in the United States
Non-profit organizations based in Maryland
Organizations established in 1971